Se solicita príncipe azul (Prince Charming Wanted) is a 2005 Venezuelan telenovela produced by Venevisión. The telenovela is an original story by Venezuelan playwright Indira Páez. Gaby Espino, Rafael Novoa, Daniela Alvarado, and Adrián Delgado starred as the main protagonists.

Plot
Maria Carlota and Maria Corina are two beautiful, strong-willed cousins who are the granddaughters of Pastor Palmieri, owner of a successful cattle ranch in the countryside. The two cousins have very different personalities, but both of them are tired of being deceived by men. Maria Carlota lives with her grandfather taking care of the ranch and the cattle where she enjoys the fields and rural, small-town life while Maria Corina is a popular socialite in the city where she cannot dream of living anywhere else.

Maria Carlota has grown up under the influence of her three brothers, children to her father's first wife. The Rivas brothers are known all over town for their love affairs and infidelities, and they have taught her to beware of love at all costs. But this perception will change for her when she meets Ricardo, a handsome lawyer with two children who lives in the sadness of his failed marriage to a cruel and selfish woman.

Maria Corina is engaged to be married to Joaquín Pérez Luna. But after witnessing his betrayal with another woman, Maria Corina moves to her grandfather's cattle estate in the countryside. There, she will meet and fall in love with Luís Carlos, Maria Carlota's half-brother. Luís Carlos, who is rough, rude and country lover, will awaken in Maria Corina intense feelings of passion that will make her change her perception about living in the country.

These two young cousins will discover that the prince of their dreams does exist in real life, but not as they would typically dream him to be.

Cast
 Gaby Espino as Maria Carlota Rivas
 Rafael Novoa as Ricardo Izaguirre
 Daniela Alvarado as Maria Corina Palmieri
 Adrián Delgado as Luís Carlos Rivas
 Raúl Amundaray as Aquiles Pérez Luna
 Estelin Betancor as Corina Palmieri
 Caridad Canelón as India Pacheco
 Carlos Cruz as Santiago Pacheco
 Christina Dieckmann as  Victoria
 Guillermo Ferrán as Pastor Palmieri
 Melena Gonzáles as Gloria
 Mauricio Gonzáles as Alcalde
 Juan De Dios Jiménes as  Sebastián Izaguirre
 Martín Lantigua as Padre Dativo
 Eduardo Luna as Padre Acacio
 Carlos Augusto Maldonado as Damián
 Liliana Meléndez as Claudia
 Eva Mondolfi as Trinita Pérez Luna
 Zair Montes as Petrica
 Verónica Ortiz as Rebeca
 Jorge Palacios as Federico del Valle
 Carolina Perpetuo as Dalia
 Rafael Romero as Agustín Rivas
 Yván Romero as Manaure
 Patricia Schwarzgruber  as  Alejandra Izaguirre
 Andres Suarez as Joaquín Pérez
 Kassandra Topper as Elizabeth
 Lourdes Valera as Miriam Rondon
 Roque Valero as Bautista
 Sonia Villamizar as Karina Valiente
 Franklin Virgüez as Ángel Rivas
 Jose Luís Zuleta as José Ramón Perdomo
 Susana Bonavides as Pasión
 Vicente Tepedino - Leonardo Pimentel

References

External links
Se solicita príncipe azul at Internet Movie Database

Venezuelan telenovelas
Venevisión telenovelas
2005 telenovelas
Spanish-language telenovelas
2005 Venezuelan television series debuts
2006 Venezuelan television series endings
Television shows set in Caracas